Mobsters is an American documentary television series that profiles the lives of infamous individuals in history; the series puts the spotlight on some of history's most infamous gangsters and all that went on during their reigns. The series most recently aired on The Biography Channel.

Some episodes of Mobsters are rehashes of the similar TV series American Justice as well as Notorious, both series that were originally broadcast on Biography Channel's sister channel, A&E Network; some episodes also rehashed segments from another A&E series American Gangster, which began airing on the Black Entertainment Television (BET) channel. The only differences are the intro of the episodes and the lead-in's after commercials. Besides this, the rehashed episodes are no different in any way. Its narrated by John Lurie.

Partial episode list
 Jimmy "The Gent" Burke Episode #4.32 aired 9/3/2012
 The Grim Reaper: Greg Scarpa Episode #4.8 aired 8/27/2012
 Carmine "The Snake" Persico Episode #4.6 aired 8/21/2012
 Anthony "Gaspipe" Casso Episode #3.5 aired 1/14/2011 
 The Mob's Greatest Hits Episode #2.9 aired 10/10/09 
 The Westies Episode #2.2 aired 8/11/2009
 Danny Greene Episode #3.2 aired 12/10/2010
 Sammy the Bull Episode #2.1 aired 3/10/2008
 Mob Ladies Episode #1.29 aired 12/12/2008
 John Gotti  Episode #1.21 aired 7/19/2008
 Frank Lucas Episode #1.3 aired 10/3/2008
 Bugsy Siegel Episode #1.1 aired 4/3/2007

External links 
 The Biography Channel's Mobsters website
 

2007 American television series debuts
2012 American television series endings
2000s American documentary television series
2010s American documentary television series
The Biography Channel shows
English-language television shows